Erebia neriene  is an East Palearctic species of satyrine butterfly found in Altai, Siberia, Ussuri, northern China and Korea.

The larva on feeds on Calamagrostis, Dactylis, Poa, Festuca and Carex species.

Subspecies
E. n. neriene (Altai, Sayan, Transbaikalia)
E. n. alcmenides Sheljuzhko, 1919 (Amur, Ussuri)

References

External links
Images representing Erebia neriene at Consortium for the Barcode of Life

Erebia
Butterflies described in 1809
Butterflies of Asia